Sunbai Oti Bharun Ja is a Marathi movie released on 11 April 1979. Produced by Ram Karve and directed by Dinkar D.Patil.

Cast 

The cast includes Avinash Masurekar, Usha Chavan, Nilu Phule, Chandrakant Madre, and Rajshekhar.

Soundtrack
The music is provided by Bal Palsule.

"Suravatichya" - Asha Bhosle

References

External links 
  Movie Album - hummaa.com

1979 films
1970s Marathi-language films
Indian drama films